Te Horeta (? – 21 November 1853), also known as Te Taniwha, was a notable New Zealand tribal leader. Of Māori descent, he identified with the Ngati Whanaunga iwi. Tukumana Te Taniwha was his grandson.

References

Year of birth missing
1853 deaths
Ngāti Whanaunga